The 2005–06 season was the third season in the Football League and the first season at the third tier of English football played by Yeovil Town Football Club, an English football club based in Yeovil, Somerset.

Yeovil began their first campaign in League One with a run of six games without a win. After an upturn in form, manager Gary Johnson left the club for West Country rivals Bristol City. His assistant Steve Thompson oversaw the rest of the campaign, inconsistent form plighted the season but even after the loss of Darren Way and Lee Johnson in January, the club's League One status was confirmed with a game to spare.

The team reached the second round of the FA Cup before losing 2–0 away at fellow League One side Walsall. The team also reached the second round of the Football League Cup knocking out Championship side Ipswich Town before losing to Millwall, while in the Football League Trophy the club were knocked by Leyton Orient in the first round. Forward Phil Jevons was the club's top goalscorer for the second consecutive season scoring 16 goals, with 15 in the league and one in the FA Cup.

Background 

The 2004–05 season was the club's second season in the Football League and manager Gary Johnson's fourth season in charge. The end of the season saw the team celebrate promotion from League Two as champions. The club released five players including Latvian international Andrejs Štolcers while Polish striker Bartosz Tarachulski rejected the club's offer of a new contract.

Four further players were offered new contracts, Colin Miles agreeing a new one-year contract while Adam Lockwood agreed a month-to-month deal. Youngsters Stephen Reed and Dale Williams both signed new one deals. Additionally player/assistant manager Steve Thompson agreed a new two-year contract. While goalkeeper Daniel Barker and midfielder Richard Cullingford entered the first team squad from the youth team after agreeing their first professional contracts. The close season also saw manager Gary Johnson reject an approach from Championship side Derby County.

Review

Pre-season 

The squad returned for pre-season training on 1 July. The first day of pre-season saw the arrival of four new signings, striker Matt Harrold joined from Brentford for a nominal fee, while left-back Nathan Jones signed following his release from Brighton & Hove Albion, winger David Poole joined after his release from Manchester United, and defender Luke Oliver signed for an undisclosed five-figure sum from Conference side Woking.

On 5 July, Yeovil set off for their Dutch training base for a pre-season tour for three matches against German opposition. The squad was joined by a selection of trialists including former Arsenal trainee Eric Obinna. Yeovil's first friendly saw them record a 1–0 victory over Regionalliga Nord side SC Preußen Münster courtesy of a Phil Jevons penalty, Yeovil then faced the reserve team of Bayer 04 Leverkusen winning the match 2–1 with goals from Adam Lockwood and Lee Johnson. Yeovil concluded their tour with a 7–1 defeat against 2. Bundesliga side Leichtathletik Rasensport Ahlen with Obinna scoring Yeovil's consolation goal, but that was the last contribution for Obinna as he was released upon Yeovil's return home. Upon the club's return, they briefly took former Nottingham Forest striker Craig Westcarr on trial, before their first home friendly of the season against Premier League side Portsmouth. Yeovil suffered a 4–2 defeat with Paul Terry and Darren Way scoring for the Glovers. The following day Yeovil traveled to Burgess Hill Town, and a collection of squad players and trialists recorded a 4–0 victory with goals from Stephen Reed, David Poole, Luke Oliver and Scott Guyett. In mid-July, young winger Dale Williams received his first two Wales under-19 caps in friendlies against Turkey.

Yeovil then had two more friendly matches in consecutive days, first a 3–1 win against Dorchester Town with goals from Kevin Gall, Jevons and Matt Harrold, followed by a trip to Staines Town again winning 3–1 with goals from Terry, trialist Paul Bastin, who was later revealed to be Pablo Bastianini, and Harrold. On 23 July, Yeovil hosted newly promoted Premier League West Ham United, a game which saw the return of Gavin Williams who received his League Two winners medals before the match. A crowd of 8,382 watch Yeovil record a 2–2 draw with Bastianini and Gall scoring the Glovers' goals. Three days later Yeovil lost 3–1 at home against relegated Premier League side Southampton. The following day Yeovil travelled to face Conference side Woking, for a benefit match for former manager Colin Lippiatt, the Glovers won the match 2–0 with goals from trialist Luciano Álvarez and Poole. Yeovil's pre-season schedule concluded with a 1–1 draw against Cheltenham Town and a 3–0 win against Tiverton Town.

After a successful trial Argentine striker Pablo Bastianini signed from Quilmes for an undisclosed club record fee, signing a two-year contract. With manager Gary Johnson, saying of the fee, "we have signed him for a club record fee but that will remain undisclosed. All I can say is that it is not six figures which some people are presuming."

August 
Yeovil's season opener in their first season in League One saw them travel to Oldham Athletic, on 6 August. Without record signing Pablo Bastianini whose international clearance had failed to come through Yeovil lost the match 2–0. On the same day a Yeovil Town XI side faced Sherborne Town in a friendly match and recorded a 3–0 win with Argentine trialist Luciano Álvarez scoring a brace and Dale Williams with the third. On 9 August, defender Scott Guyett joined Conference side Aldershot Town on a one-month loan deal, that evening Yeovil drew 0–0 with Rotherham United in their first home match in League One. Following the match defender Adam Lockwood signed a new one-year contract, On 13 August, Yeovil drew 1–1 with Blackpool with Kevin Amankwaah scoring Yeovil's first goal of the season. Young defender Stephen Reed joined Woking on a short-term loan deal, while Arron Davies scored in a 3–1 victory for Wales under-21s against Malta. On 18 August, record signing Pablo Bastiaini finally received his international clearance, and the following day Yeovil signed a second Argentine, Luciano Álvarez signing a four-month contract after a successful trial. Bastianini's debut though saw Yeovil lost 1–0 away at Barnsley a result which saw Yeovil fall to the foot of the table. On 23 August, Yeovil faced Championship side Ipswich Town in the first round of the League Cup. Yeovil recorded their first victory of the season with Darren Way and Kevin Gall both scoring in a 2–0 win. With the transfer deadline looming, Yeovil rejected a bid in the region of £100,000 from Swansea City for the services of Lee Johnson, while defender Michael Rose joined Cheltenham Town on a month's loan deal. but forward Kevin Gall rejected a move to Carlisle United after the two club had agreed an unspecified fee. On 27 August, Yeovil lost 4–2 to Swindon Town, with Bastianini scoring his first goal for the club after just 26 seconds. Three days later Yeovil completed a winless month in the league, losing 3–1 at home to Chesterfield with Álvarez scoring his first Yeovil goal. Transfer deadline day saw Yeovil bring in Liam Fontaine on loan from Fulham, while Luke Oliver returned to Woking on loan, and Dale Williams joined Tiverton Town on loan.

September 

Yeovil began September by recording their first League victory of the season, winning 1–0 away at Hartlepool United, with Pablo Bastianini's header enough for victory. Arron Davies who missed the match appeared in two more matches for Wales under-21s. On 10 September, Yeovil recorded their second successive win a 2–1 victory over Walsall to move off the foot of the table, with Phil Jevons scoring his first goal of the season.
The following week saw the extension of Scott Guyett's loan at Aldershot Town for a further month, the signing of Uruguayan defender Alejandro Meloño on a short-term contract and the departure of Andy Lindegaard on loan to Crawley Town. On 17 September, Yeovil drew 1–1 away at Bradford City, while Stephen Reed having returned from his loan at Woking was immediately sent out on loan to Aldershot Town. Yeovil then faced Millwall in the second round of the League Cup, after being reduced to ten-men Yeovil were knocked out losing 2–1. The game turned out to be the last match at Yeovil for manager Gary Johnson, who left the club to join West Country rivals Bristol City. Johnson departed after four seasons in which he had overseen two promotions and victory in the FA Trophy. Johnson's assistant Steve Thompson took over as caretaker boss and recorded a 1–0 victory in his first match in charge against Port Vale, with summer signing Matt Harrold scoring his first goal for the club. On 27 September, Yeovil travelled to Southend United and despite taking the lead courtesy of a Jevons free-kick ultimately lost 4–1. The end of September also saw Thompson bring in former Yeovil goalkeeper Len Bond as the club's new goalkeeping coach.

October 
Yeovil started October with a trip to Scunthorpe United and after trailing 2–0 inside the first 20 minutes, Yeovil mounted a remarkable comeback to win the match 4–3 with goals from Darren Way, Phil Jevons and a brace from first-half substitute Matt Harrold. That result was enough to convince the Yeovil board to appoint manager Steve Thompson on a permanent basis. Thompson celebrated his permanent appointment with a 1–0 victory over league leaders Swansea City, a result which saw Yeovil rise to eighth in the table. On 10 October, Yeovil appointed former Plymouth Argyle manager Kevin Hodges as their new assistant manager to work with Steve Thompson. Yeovil then faced two away matches recording a goalless draw against Gillingham, before losing 2–0 to Leyton Orient in the first round of the Football League Trophy. The Gillingham match saw midfielder Darren Way suffer a fractured cheekbone and eye socket that ruled him out for four weeks. On 20 October, Yeovil confirmed Andy Lindegaard had extended his loan at Crawley Town for another month. On 22 October, Yeovil recorded an impressive a 3–0 win against Nottingham Forest, with Jevons scoring a brace. On 24 October, the club confirmed the departure of Uruguay Alejandro Meloño after his contract terminated by mutual consent having only started two matches. Yeovil ended the month losing 3–2 away at Colchester United.

November 
Yeovil needed a late goal from Phil Jevons to salvage a replay in their FA Cup first round match against League Two side Macclesfield Town. After a series of injuries in central midfield, Yeovil signed West Ham United midfielder Chris Cohen on a month-loan deal, that was subsequently extended until the end of the season. Yeovil then suffered a 2–1 home defeat against Huddersfield Town, before on 15 November, Yeovil faced Macclesfield in their FA Cup first round replay and a goalscoring return of Darren Way from injury led Yeovil to a 4–0 victory. On 18 November, full-back Adam Lockwood joined Torquay United on a month's loan. Yeovil then suffered two defeats to end November losing 2–0 to Swansea City, before losing by the same scoreline at home to Oldham Athletic. The Swansea match saw midfielder Darren Way suffer a recurrence of a shin injury that ruled him out until January. The end of the month saw young winger Dale Williams join Newport County on loan, while Luke Oliver returned from his loan at Woking.

December 
On 3 December, Yeovil were knocked out of the FA Cup in the second round by Walsall, losing 2–0. Yeovil then travelled to Brentford, where after being reduced to ten-men after the dismissal of goalkeeper Chris Weale lost the match 3–2. With the suspension of Weale and injury to third choice keeper Daniel Barker, saw Yeovil sign former Benfica goalkeeper Francisco Ramos on non-contract terms as cover. Yeovil then recorded back-to-back 2–1 victories, first away at Rotherham United, and then at home against Barnsley. After the Barnsley match, Yeovil announced that Argentine striker Luciano Álvarez had returned to Argentina after the club decided not to extend his contract. A late penalty from Phil Jevons earned Yeovil a 1–1 draw against Bournemouth in the first of their Christmas fixtures, Yeovil then travelled to Tranmere Rovers where despite taking the lead through another Jevons penalty the Glovers suffered a heavy 4–1 defeat. On 30 December, the club announced that former manager David Webb had bought out Jon Goddard-Watts to become the majority shareholder and chief executive of the club, with John Fry remaining as chairman. New Year's Eve saw Yeovil welcome manager Gary Johnson back to the club, as the Glovers drew 1–1 with his new club Bristol City, ending the year in 18th place in the league table.

January 

The opening of the January transfer window saw Yeovil loan out Michael Rose to Scunthorpe United until the end of the season. Three goals from Phil Jevons were enough for Yeovil to record back-to-back victories to begin January, 1–0 away at Doncaster Rovers, and 2–0 at home to Hartlepool United. On 7 January, Nigerian international defender Efe Sodje left the club for Southend United for an undisclosed fee. Subsequently, on 11 January, midfielder Lee Johnson also left the club for Scottish Premier League side Heart of Midlothian for £50,000. On 14 January, Yeovil drew 1–1 with Milton Keynes Dons. Subsequently, Yeovil announced the signing of new owner David Webb's son, Daniel on an 18-month contract. On 20 January, midfielder Darren Way left the club, after a bid of £150,000 from Swansea City was accepted. Yeovil's final match of January saw them lose 1–0 at home to Bradford City. The end of the month saw the club award youth team graduate Gavin McCallum his first professional contract, the Canada under-20 international signing an 18-month deal. The club also announced the departure of defender Luke Oliver to Stevenage Borough for a fee of £15,000. The end of the transfer window saw Yeovil complete three signings, former Jamaica under-23 defender Bradley Thomas signed from Eastleigh on a free transfer, Accrington Stanley midfielder Anthony Barry for an undisclosed fee, and former Derby County defender Jamie Vincent on a short-term contract.

February 
Yeovil began February with consecutive defeats first a 2–0 loss at home against Southend United, and then followed with a 1–0 loss away at Port Vale. On 14 February, a dramatic equaliser in the third minute of injury time gave rock-bottom Milton Keynes Dons a 1–1 draw against Yeovil. On 20 February, owner David Webb decided to step down as Yeovil's chief executive, and decided not to join the board of directors. A third defeat of the month saw Yeovil slip into the relegation zone for the first time since September, as the club lost 2–0 away at Blackpool.

March 
The start of March, saw Yeovil confirm the signing of Northern Irish international midfielder Tommy Doherty on loan from Queens Park Rangers on a one-month loan deal, while Stephen Reed joined Torquay United on loan until the end of the season. A hat-trick from Welsh attacking midfielder Arron Davies earned Yeovil a 3–0 victory away at Chesterfield, on 4 March, to record their first win in seven matches and move out of the relegation zone. The Chesterfield match though saw Yeovil suffer injuries to both Doherty and Anthony Barry who was ruled out for the rest of the season with a dislocated knee. After an injury to Chris Weale, Francisco Ramos returned to the club as goalkeeper cover for the club's trip to Brentford, but Yeovil lost the match 2–1. In an attempt to ease the club's injury crisis, Yeovil signed Irish midfielder Marc Wilson on loan from Portsmouth for a month and goalkeeper Michael Jordan on loan from Arsenal until the end of the season. On 11 March, Yeovil drew 0–0 with relegation rivals Swindon Town, in the week following the match the club confirmed that Jamie Vincent had joined Millwall on loan until the end of the season. While club record signing Pablo Bastianini had left the club after having his contract terminated by mutual consent. On 18 March, Yeovil suffered a 1–0 defeat away at Bournemouth, before bouncing back with a comfortable 2–0 victory over Walsall with goals from Matt Harrold and Arron Davies. On 23 March, Yeovil completed the loan signings of Craig Rocastle from Sheffield Wednesday and midfielder Sam Alsop from Birmingham City. Yeovil ended March with a 2–2 draw against Tranmere Rovers after twice having the lead courtesy of Matt Harrold.

April and May 

On 1 April, Yeovil travelled to West Country rivals Bristol City where a goal from Arron Davies was only a consolation in a 2–1 defeat. Yeovil then boosted their survival hopes with a 3–0 victory over Doncaster Rovers with goals from Terry Skiverton, Phil Jevons and Arron Davies. On 14 April, Yeovil suffered a 1–0 home defeat against Scunthorpe United, the game saw goalkeeper Chris Weale suffer a serious anterior cruciate ligament injury which ruled him out until at least December 2006. Yeovil took the lead through an early Phil Jevons free-kick away at Nottingham Forest but the Reds fought back to condemn Yeovil to a 2–1 defeat. Yeovil's penultimate home fixture of the season saw the visit of Gillingham. After falling behind, Yeovil scored four goals without reply through a Jevons penalty, Chris Cohen's first goal for the club, Paul Terry and Arron Davies, and despite a late fightback Yeovil held on for a 4–3 victory. A second half fightback in Yeovil's final away match of the season against promotion chasing Huddersfield Town, saw Yeovil confirm their League One status, thanks to a brace from topscorer Phil Jevons. Yeovil's final match of the season saw them welcome second place Colchester United, having already confirmed their safety Yeovil earned a credible 0–0 draw to finish the season in 15th position. The match also saw the club give youth team graduate Dale Williams his professional debut.

Summary and aftermath 

After a sluggish start to the season, Yeovil's form recovered even after the departure of manager Gary Johnson in September, and confirmed their League One safety with one match to spare. In the league the team won 8 matches, drew 8 and lost 7 at home, compared to winning 7, drawing 3 and losing 13 away from home. Matt Harrold and Nathan Jones recorded the highest number of appearances during the season, appearing in 48 of Yeovil's 51 matches. Phil Jevons was Yeovil's top scorer for the second season in succession with 16 goals each, with 15 those coming in the league.

The end of the season saw a major turnover of players with Steve Thompson initially releasing four players Richard Cullingford, Kevin Gall, Stephen Reed and Michael Rose. Despite Thompson wanting to offer him a contract young winger Dale Williams was allowed to leave by Chairman John Fry. Having not appeared for the club since his signing in January, Jamie Vincent was also released. Goalkeeper Steve Collis was also allowed to leave the club having not been offered a contract, while both Chris Weale and top-scorer Phil Jevons were reunited with former manager Gary Johnson at Bristol City after rejecting new contracts. Defender Adam Lockwood and Colin Miles also both rejected new contract offers and left the club. Captain Terry Skiverton agreed a one-year contract extension until the summer of 2008, and defender Scott Guyett and midfielders Andy Lindegaard and Paul Terry all agreed new one-year contracts. The club also handed professional deals to three members of their under-18 title winning side Craig Alcock, Thomas Clarke and Jake Smeeton.

Despite successfully avoiding relegation, manager Steve Thompson was demoted by chairman John Fry back to his previous post of assistant, as the club hired former Grimsby Town manager Russell Slade as their new manager, on a three-year contract, with Kevin Hodges leaving the club. Slade's arrival also saw the appointment of John Milton as the club's new football general manager. Physio Glen Schmidt also left the club to join Johnson at Bristol City. The summer also saw Chairman John Fry purchase David Webb's 92% share in the club for a significant, although undisclosed sum, to become majority shareholder at the club as well as chairman and chief executive.

The off-season also saw Arron Davies make his full international debut for Wales in a friendly against Trinidad and Tobago, after receiving his first cap Davies agreed a new two-year contract with Yeovil.

Club

Coaching staff 
Until 23 September 2005

From 23 September 2005

Kit 

|
|
|

Transfers

In

Out

Loan in

Loan out

Match results 
League positions are sourced from Statto, while the remaining contents of each table are sourced from the references in the "Ref" column.

League One

League table

FA Cup

League Cup

Football League Trophy

Squad statistics 
Source:

Numbers in parentheses denote appearances as substitute.
Players with squad numbers struck through and marked  left the club during the playing season.
Players with names in italics and marked * were on loan from another club for the whole of their season with Yeovil.
Players listed with no appearances have been in the matchday squad but only as unused substitutes.
Key to positions: GK – Goalkeeper; DF – Defender; MF – Midfielder; FW – Forward

See also 
 2005–06 in English football
 List of Yeovil Town F.C. seasons

References 

2005–06 Football League One by team
2005-06